The Truth About Juliet is a 1997 comedy film directed by Sean McGinly. The plot concerns four friends in Los Angeles.

References

External links
The Truth About Juliet at BFI

1997 films
1997 comedy films
American comedy films
Films scored by Alan Lazar
1990s English-language films
Films directed by Sean McGinly
1990s American films